RTTP may refer to:

Technology
 Real-time Transport Protocol, an Internet protocol

Entertainment
 Return to the Pit, a radio show

Education
 Reacting to the Past, a prototype that led to other historical role-playing games
 Registered Technology Transfer Professional, "The RTTP designation tells employers, colleagues and others in our industry that you have demonstrated core competencies and are responsible for significant achievements and contributions in the field of technology transfer." from the http://attp.info website.